The Karre Mountains is a range of granite hills in the Central African Republic. Their southern elevations form part of the watershed of the Congo River. The highest point in this range is Mont Ngaoui at 4,625 feet.

History
The Karre Mountains were used as a natural defense by Africans resisting the French Colonists. In the 20th Century, during the colonization of Africa, the French had difficulty trying to take Central African Republic due to these mountains.

References
 
 
 

Mountains of the Central African Republic